Ezaki may refer to:
 9756 Ezaki, a main-belt asteroid, named after Yusuke Ezaki (born 1957)
 Eiji Ezaki (1968–2016), name of Japanese wrestler Hayabusa
 Ezaki Glico, a Japanese food company
 Ezzaki Badou (aka Ezaki Badou; Zaki; born 1959), a Moroccan football player and club manager 
 Kenjiro Ezaki (born 1926), a Japanese composer
 Kohei Ezaki (1904–1963), a Japanese Nihonga painter
 Toshiko Ezaki, a Japanese musician